The Apollonicon was presented to the public the first time in 1817 built by the English Organ builders Flight & Robson in London.
It was an automatic playing machine with about 1,900 pipes and 45 organ stops with a technic familiar to the barrel organ. It was inspired by Johann Nepomuk Mälzel's Panharmonikon. It also had five keyboards, one of them used as the pedal keyboard, so the instrument could be played by a few persons in manual mode as well.

A very detailed description with drawings can be found in the Mechanics Magazine from 1828. A notice about it is to be found in Polytechnisches Journal, 1828, with the Germanized name Apollonikon.

References

External links
 Description at the British Institute of Organ Studies, with drawings and a bibliography
 Description in The Victorian Dictionary

Keyboard instruments
Aerophones
Mechanical musical instruments
1817 introductions